Adam Mokrysz (born on July 25, 1979 in Cieszyn) is a Polish entrepreneur, investor and philanthropist. The son of Teresa and Kazimierz Mokrysz, the founders of Mokate. PhD of economics, CEO of the Mokate Group and Mokate S.A. Expert in the field of business in the FMCG industry. It actively supports the development of local communities and education. A chess fan and their popularization among children and teenagers.

Education 
A graduate of Management and Marketing at the University of Economics in Katowice. There he obtained a PhD in management science. He has a diploma of the University of London in the field of foreign trade. In addition, he completed the post-graduate IMD-AEDP - Accelerated Executive Development Program at the University of Lausanne.

Career 
Successor and leader of the MOKATE Group Family Business. He gained his knowledge and skills when working his way up from the basics in the areas of marketing, purchasing and sales. Thanks to his 20 years of experience in the development of B2B and B2C products (retail, brand and international), and his work on the increase of export by reaching the markets of more than 70 countries, today the MOKATE Group is one of the top Polish export producers, and export accounts for 70% of its revenues. In January 2016, he took over as the President of the Group, and is responsible for the development of new business directions, creates and develops company identity. At the international fairs, he is regarded as the leading expert of the FMCG industry from Central Europe.

Social activity 
He has been playing chess since he was a kid, and he promotes the game in Poland. He supports the development of local communities with the Polish Chess Federation Polish Chess Federation project entitled “Education through chess in school.” He regularly co-organises chess tournaments and championships following the principle of “MOKATE makes you think,” he is a committed and active partner of the Polish Chess Federation. Adam's long-term goal is to introduce chess to primary schools as an obligatory subject.

Prizes and awards 
 Silver Cross of Merit;
 Employer Trustworthy;
 Leader of Polish Business;
 Golden Super Caesar of Silesian Business;
 Outstanding Entrepreneur 2018;
 EY Entrepreneur of the Year;
 Manager of the Year 2017;
 Polish promoter;
 Champion of Business 2018;
 Investor without Borders;
 ENTREPRENEUR MAGNUS 2018 Outstanding Entrepreneur.

References 

Polish businesspeople
investors
Polish philanthropists
1979 births
Living people